Tales of my Landlord is a series of novels by Sir Walter Scott (1771–1832) that form a subset of the so-called Waverley Novels. There are four series:

Of these, The Heart of Midlothian and The Bride of Lammermoor have been the most successful, and Old Mortality is considered by modern critics to be among Scott's best work. The fourth were the least successful.

They were so called because they were supposed to be tales collected from the (fictional) landlord of the Wallace Inn at Gandercleugh, compiled by a "Peter Pattieson", and edited and sent to the publisher by Jedediah Cleishbotham. This is gone into in great depth in the introduction to The Black Dwarf.

The first series was planned to comprise four volumes, each containing a separate novel, but Scott – by his own admission – botched The Black Dwarf, and Old Mortality came to be three volumes in its own right. . The other three series thus consisted of two volumes each, or just one, in the case of the second.

They were supposed to reflect aspects of Scottish regional life.

See also

 Waverley Novels

Frame stories
Walter Scott novel series
Novels set in Scotland
Books about landlords